The Southern District is one of the 18 districts of Hong Kong. It is located in the southern part of Hong Kong Island. It had a population of 274,994 in 2016.

Geography

The Southern District faces the South China Sea at the south, and is backed by hills and reservoirs, designated as Country Parks, at the north. The eastern half of the district is semi-rural, with some of Hong Kong's most popular beaches. The western half of the district is partly residential and partly industrial.

Residential areas
The residents of Southern District vary from the Chinese majority to the community of expats. The eastern half containing areas such as Stanley and Repulse Bay is especially popular among expats and affluent locals because of the combination of its close proximity to Central and the wholesome environment. The western half of Southern district is more urbanized and areas such as Aberdeen containing more housing developments than the eastern half.

Large private housing estates in the district include: Baguio Villa, Chi Fu Fa Yuen, Aberdeen Centre, South Horizons, Bel-Air Residence, Redhill Peninsula and Hong Kong Parkview.

Areas and attractions
The district includes the following areas:

 Aberdeen
 Ap Lei Chau, an island connected to Aberdeen by 2 bridges (1 for road and the other for rail)
 Cape D'Aguilar, where Cape D'Aguilar Marine Reserve is located in.
 Deep Water Bay
 Pok Fu Lam
 Repulse Bay
 Shek O
 Shouson Hill
 Stanley
 Tai Tam
 Wah Fu
 Wong Chuk Hang

Islands of the district:
 Aberdeen Island or Ap Lei Chau
 Ap Lei Pai
 Kau Pei Chau
 Lo Chau
 Lung Shan Pai
 Magazine Island
 Middle Island (熨波洲, Tong Po Chau)
 Ng Fan Chau

 Round Island
 Tai Tau Chau
 Tau Chau

Tourist attractions within the district include Aberdeen's floating restaurants and fishing harbour; the Ocean Park; the swimming beach of Repulse Bay; The Home of Teresa Teng; the souvenir market and, formerly, the Hong Kong Maritime Museum at Stanley.

Transportation
The Southern District is served by Pok Fu Lam Road, Aberdeen Tunnel, Wong Nai Chung Gap Road and Tai Tam Road. It became the last district of Hong Kong to be served by the MTR, when the South Island line commenced operations in 2016, linking Ap Lei Chau and Wong Chuk Hang with Admiralty. The proposed MTR South Island line (West) will serve the western half of the area. There are currently no proposed routes to Stanley or Repulse Bay due to the large number of buses that serve those destinations.

Education
 List of schools in Southern District, Hong Kong

See also
 List of places in Hong Kong

References

External links

 Southern District Council
 List and map of electoral constituencies 1 (large PDF file)
 List and map of electoral constituencies 2 (large PDF file)
 Hong Kong Ocean Park

 
Districts of Hong Kong
Hong Kong Island